4833 Meges  is a large Jupiter trojan from the Greek camp, approximately  in diameter. It was discovered on 8 January 1989, by American astronomer Carolyn Shoemaker at the Palomar Observatory in California. The D-type asteroid belongs to the 40 largest Jupiter trojans and has a rotation period of 14.25 hours. It was named after Meges from Greek mythology.

Orbit and classification 

Meges is a dark Jovian asteroid orbiting in the leading Greek camp at Jupiter's  Lagrangian point, 60° ahead of its orbit in a 1:1 resonance (see Trojans in astronomy). It is also a non-family asteroid in the Jovian background population.

It orbits the Sun at a distance of 4.8–5.7 AU once every 12.01 years (4,387 days; semi-major axis of 5.24 AU). Its orbit has an eccentricity of 0.09 and an inclination of 35° with respect to the ecliptic. The body's observation arc begins with its official discovery observation at Palomar in January 1989.

Physical characteristics 

In both the Tholen- and SMASS-like taxonomy of the Small Solar System Objects Spectroscopic Survey (S3OS2), Meges is a dark D-type asteroid, the most common spectral type in the Jovian asteroid population, especially in the Greek camp. Its V–I color index of 0.94 is typical for most Jupiter trojans. It is also an assumed C-type asteroid.

Diameter and albedo 

According to the surveys carried out by the Infrared Astronomical Satellite IRAS, the Japanese Akari satellite and the NEOWISE mission of NASA's Wide-field Infrared Survey Explorer, Meges measures between 80.16 and 89.39 kilometers in diameter and its surface has an albedo between 0.053 and 0.076. The Collaborative Asteroid Lightcurve Link derives an albedo of 0.0635 and a diameter of 87.52 kilometers based on an absolute magnitude of 8.9.

Rotation period 

In August 1995, a rotational lightcurve of Meges was obtained by ESO astronomers Stefano Mottola and Hans-Josef Schober using the Bochum 0.61-metre Telescope at La Silla Observatory in Chile. Lightcurve analysis gave a well-defined rotation period of 14.250 hours with a brightness variation of 0.13 magnitude.

Photometric observation of this asteroid by Robert Stephens and Daniel Coley at the Center for Solar System Studies during 2016 and 2017, gave two lightcurves with a concurring period of 14.266 and 14.285 hours and an amplitude of 0.27 and 0.44, respectively.

Naming 

This minor planet was named by the discoverer from Greek mythology after Meges, commander of the Greek contingent from Dulichium and Echinae who brought 40 ships to the Trojan War. Together with Thoas, after whom 4834 Thoas was named, he helped to persuaded Achilles to rejoin the Trojan War. Meges was one of the men to enter the wooden Trojan Horse. The official naming citation was published by the Minor Planet Center on 25 August 1991.

Notes

References

External links 
 Asteroid Lightcurve Database (LCDB), query form (info )
 (4833) Meges, Dictionary of Minor Planet Names
 Dictionary of Minor Planet Names, Google books
 Discovery Circumstances: Numbered Minor Planets (1)-(5000) – Minor Planet Center
 
 

004833
Discoveries by Carolyn S. Shoemaker
Named minor planets
19890108